Pharus legumen (also known as the bean razor clam or the bean solen), is a species of bivalve mollusc commonly found burrowed in the sand on lower shores and in the shallow sublittoral.

Description 
Pharus legumen is up to 130mm long and has a characteristic bean-shaped shell. The shell colour ranges from white to light brown and it displays a light olive to yellow periostracum. The right valve has a single cardinal tooth and a short peg-like posterior lateral tooth, whereas the left valve has two elongated and closely spaced cardinal teeth and a single posterior lateral tooth.

Distribution 
Pharus legumen is commonly found in the English Channel, in the north-east Atlantic and in the Mediterranean Sea.

Similar species 
Pharus legumen is similar to other species of razor clam of the genus Ensis, Phaxas and Solen. The key feature to identify it is the presence of a ligament in the middle third of the shell.

Invalid taxonomic names 
Solen legumen Linnaeus, 1758
Ceratisolen legumiformis (Locard, 1886)
Ceratisolen legumen (Step, 1927)

References 

Pharidae
Molluscs of the Atlantic Ocean
Molluscs of the Mediterranean Sea
Molluscs described in 1758
Taxa named by Carl Linnaeus